Harry Kane (born 24 May 1933) is a British former Olympic hurdler. Born "Harry Cohen" to a Jewish family in England, he set British and Maccabiah Games records during his career.

Biography
Kane set an English inter-country record in the 440 yard hurdles, and matched the Scottish all-comers record. In 1952, at the British Athletic Championships he won the 120 yard hurdles with a time of 15.4, and the 200 yard hurdles with a time of 23.3. At the 1953 Maccabiah Games, Kane won the 400 meter with a games record times of 50.5.

In 1954, at the British Athletic Championships he won the 440 yard hurdles with a time of 53.4.  In 1954, competing for England, Kane was second in the 1954 British Empire and Commonwealth Games 440 yard hurdles, with a time of 53.3. His personal best in the 400 was 51.5, in 1954, setting a British record.  In 1954, he was ranked seventh in the world in the 400 hurdles.

Kane competed for England in the 1956 Summer Olympics in Melbourne, in the 400 meter hurdles.

In 1957, he was ranked eighth in the world in the 400 hurdles.  That year, Kane won a gold medal at the 1957 Maccabiah Games in the quarter mile run, won the 400 meter hurdles, and took a silver medal in the 200 meter hurdles, with a time of 25.3 seconds.

In his early athletics career, in May 1949, Kane finished runner up in two flat races in an athletics competition held in Victoria Park, Bethnal Green. Kane finished second in the 220yds sprint to his cousin, Ivor Baylin and Kane finished second to Dove in the 440yds race.

References

1933 births
Living people
British male hurdlers
Athletes (track and field) at the 1956 Summer Olympics
Olympic athletes of Great Britain
Athletes (track and field) at the 1954 British Empire and Commonwealth Games
Commonwealth Games silver medallists for England
Commonwealth Games medallists in athletics
Place of birth missing (living people)
Maccabiah Games gold medalists for Great Britain
English Jews
Jewish male athletes (track and field)
Maccabiah Games medalists in athletics
Competitors at the 1953 Maccabiah Games
Competitors at the 1957 Maccabiah Games
Medallists at the 1954 British Empire and Commonwealth Games